Claymation Easter is a 1992 stop-motion animated short film by Will Vinton. The Easter-themed special won an Emmy for Outstanding Animated Program. The special aired on CBS on April 19, 1992.

Plot 
A pig named Wilshire tries to run field tests on a new shark-proof diving suit, using another pig, Vince, and a live shark as his test subjects. After the shark swallows Vince whole, Wilshire considers the test results "inconclusive".

Later, Wilshire, looking at his $1.5 million electricity bill, listens to an interview with the Easter Bunny on the radio. As the host, Spike Rabbit, takes questions from callers, one listener asks the Easter Bunny why he turned down a $5 million endorsement deal for tennis shoes. Wilshire's ears perk up and he calls the station to ask for more details. The Easter Bunny answers, saying his position is an ancient and sacred trust, refusing to violate it. Intrigued, Wilshire calls in to ask what would happen if something tragic befell the Easter Bunny, and who would replace him.

Wilshire learns that, according to ancient customs, a new Easter Bunny would be chosen by a contest of champions. Armed with this information, Wilshire hatches a plan to eliminate the Easter Bunny and inherit his position, becoming an "Easter Pig". The next morning, he disguises himself as a salesman for vacuum cleaners, enters the Easter Bunny's cottage, and cranks up his vacuum cleaner, sucking up everything inside the house, including the Easter Bunny himself.

That night, news breaks over the radio that the Easter Bunny is missing and that, if he is not found by Friday, an Easter Race will be held to determine a replacement. Wilshire deduces that, to be the Easter Bunny, he must think and act like a rabbit. He turns to Dr. Spike Rabbit (the same talk show host from earlier) for help. Wearing a cyan rabbit costume, Wilshire claims that he is a "rabbit trapped in a pig's body" and "wants to come out of the carrot patch" by Friday. So for the next few days, Spike has Wilshire steal carrots from a carrot patch, only to be viciously attacked by the farmer's dog. Then, Spike pits Wilshire into crossing freeways. After three unsuccessful attempts, Wilshire recovers in his workshop, where Spike finds the Easter Bunny. After he finds out that Wilshire was the kidnapper, Wilshire springs a trapdoor, sending both Spike and the Easter Bunny into a pit.

The Easter Race is held at a large amphitheater, and Wilshire manages to enter by citing the lack of a written law saying that only rabbits are allowed to compete. Meanwhile, Spike and the Easter Bunny are suspended over the shark tank until the shark jumps up and swallows the two rabbits whole. They find Vince, alive and well, playing solitaire.

Phase One of the Easter Race begins and involves hatching an Easter Egg. Wilshire sits on his egg like the other contestants, but grows impatient with the recalcitrant chick. He uses a bomb to force the egg open, taking out a couple of rivals. The crowd boos at Wilshire's victory.

In the shark's belly, Vince suggests building a fire like in Pinocchio as a way of getting out, but Spike points out the excess of stomach acid would be dangerous if lit. Spike soon gets an idea to give the shark an upset stomach by singing "Release Me", which is enough for the shark to start sobbing.

Wilshire makes it to Phase Two of the Easter Race, which involves delivering eggs to cardboard cutouts of children. While the other rabbits start up their mopeds, Wilshire uses a modified lowrider with mechanical arms and legs, crushing any competitors that get in the way and injuring others. Wilshire wins again only because he is the last contestant left standing, much to the dismay of the crowd.

The third and Final Phase of the Easter Race involves Freeway Crossing on a fake freeway. When Wilshire takes a step, he is surprised to see that nothing happens. He ecstatically breaks into a victory dance, enduring massive booing from the crowd. However, before Wilshire can enter the coronation throne, the shark, moved by Spike's singing, spits out the three animals up into the air, sending them right into the amphitheater. The Easter Bunny lands on the throne. Noticing this, Wilshire, denying any wrongdoing, inadvertently steps on the fake freeway and gets run over by a truck. Spike leads the crowd in a rendition of the Hallelujah chorus as the Easter Bunny wishes everyone a Happy Easter.

During the end credits, one of the rats from Wilshire's lab playfully scurries around one of the bunny guards from the amphitheater, before biting the guard's leg, and the guard's scream can be heard off camera as the Will Vinton Productions logo is shown.

Cast 
 Tim Conner - Vince Pig
 Jim Cummings - Dr. Spike Rabbit, Stadium Announcer
 Michele Mariana - Wilshire Pig, Radio Reporter
 Todd Tolces - Easter Bunny, Judges

References

External links 
 

1992 television specials
1990s American television specials
1990s animated television specials
Stop-motion animated television shows
Emmy Award-winning programs
Easter television specials
Easter Bunny in television